The Ordnance BL 2.75-inch mountain gun was a screw gun designed for and used by the Indian Mountain Artillery into World War I.

Description
The gun was an improved version of the 1901 BL 10-pounder mountain gun.

It was a screw gun design, where the barrel could be separated into two parts via a screw joint. This allowed for the gun to have a heavier barrel, but still be broken into smaller portions for transport by mule teams. This was important for a weapon designed to be used in mountainous and rough terrain, or where adequate vehicle and horse transport was not readily available. The weapon could be carried by six mules or towed.

Service history

The gun was adopted in 1911 and began entering service in 1914.

The weapon served primarily with the Indian Mountain Artillery in the northwest portion of British Indian territory (on what is now the border between Pakistan and Afghanistan) and participated in British-led military action in that theatre.

It also served in Mesopotamia and the Salonika front during World War I.

Due to its specialised nature the gun was produced in only limited numbers, with just 183 manufactured during the war.

It was superseded at the end of World War I by the QF 3.7-inch mountain howitzer.

Ammunition

Surviving examples

A 2.75-inch mountain gun is on display at the Heugh Battery Museum, Hartlepool

See also
 List of mountain artillery

Notes and references

Bibliography
Dale Clarke, British Artillery 1914-1919. Field Army Artillery. Osprey Publishing, Oxford UK, 2004 
Hogg, Ian; 2000; Twentieth Century Artillery; Amber Books, Ltd., 
I.V. Hogg & L.F. Thurston, British Artillery Weapons & Ammunition. London: Ian Allan, 1972

External links

 Handbook of the 2.75-inch B.L. gun : Mule equipment. London : H.M.S.O. 1920 at State Library of Victoria
 Gun drill for 2.75 inch B.L. gun converted MK I and MK I carriage mark I 1921,1923 at State Library of Victoria
 2.75 inch Mountain Gun at Landships

World War I artillery of the United Kingdom
Mountain artillery
70 mm artillery
World War I mountain artillery